Eutropiichthys is a genus of schilbid catfishes native to Asia.

Species
There are currently 7 recognized species in this genus:
 Eutropiichthys britzi Ferraris & Vari, 2007
 Eutropiichthys burmannicus Day, 1877
 Eutropiichthys cetosus H. H. Ng, Lalramliana, Lalronunga & Lalnuntluanga, 2014 
 Eutropiichthys goongwaree Sykes, 1839
 Eutropiichthys murius Hamilton, 1822
 Eutropiichthys salweenensis Ferraris & Vari, 2007
 Eutropiichthys vacha Hamilton, 1822

References

Schilbeidae
Fish of Asia
Freshwater fish genera
Catfish genera
Taxa named by Pieter Bleeker